Sultan Al-Sawadi (born 14 December 1992) is a Saudi Arabian professional footballer who plays as a winger for Al-Wehda.

Career
Al-Sawadi started his career at the youth team of Al-Ahli. Al-Sawadi made his first-team debut on 27 April 2012, in the King Cup match against Al-Faisaly. He signed his first professional contract with the club on 25 June 2012. On 5 January 2015, Al-Sawadi joined Al-Taawoun on loan. On 4 July 2015, Al-Sawadi was loaned out to Al-Raed. On 20 July 2016, Al-Sawadi was released from his contract by Al-Ahli. On 26 July 2016, Al-Sawadi joined Al-Raed on a permanent deal. On 9 March 2017, Al-Sawadi renewed his contract with Al-Raed, signing a three-year deal. On 20 January 2020, Al-Sawadi joined Al-Wehda on a free transfer. On 12 July 2022, Al-Sawadi renewed his contract with Al-Wehda.

Career statistics

Club

Honours
Al-Ahli
King Cup: 2012

Al-Wehda
First Division third place: 2021–22 (promotion to Pro League)

References

External links 
 

1992 births
Saudi Arabian footballers
Sportspeople from Jeddah
Living people
Al-Ahli Saudi FC players
Al-Taawoun FC players
Al-Raed FC players
Al-Wehda Club (Mecca) players
Saudi Professional League players
Saudi First Division League players
Association football wingers